or  (pronounced ) is a cultivar of the tea plant that is usually processed into oolong. It originates from Anxi County in Fujian province, in the People's Republic of China. The taste is light and the aroma is often compared to orchids.

See also
 Oolong
 Taiwanese tea

References
 .
 

Wuyi tea
Chinese teas
Chinese tea grown in Fujian
Oolong tea
Cultivars of tea grown in China
-